The Pawnshop No. 8 (also known as Pawnshop #8) is a 2003 Taiwanese television series focusing on two characters who share ownership on a pawnshop.  The supernatural-tinged show airs on ImaginAsian in the United States. Critically acclaimed and well received in numerous Asian countries, especially Mainland China, The Pawnshop No. 8 blends elements of Western religions such as Christianity excellently with pre-modern and modern Chinese society.

The main theme of The Pawnshop No. 8 is that of love, with the main background of the eternal conflict between Heaven and Hell, good and evil, God and Satan. After being bested by the Creator and his unfallen angels countless eons past, Satan, now banished from Paradise and desperate for vengeance, devised a pawnshop to lure mainly Chinese customers, seeking to capture all of humanity's souls for Darkness to reign supreme, coercing random humans whose souls were bent towards his own and whom could perceive his presence to serve as his minions, the owner of the pawnshop and their assistant. To counter Satan's nefarious strategies, God sent angels in the forms of humans, to help the targeted humans brave through the temptations of Satan and use their own power and will to defeat the Enemy's lure. However, the human force of love turns both God and Satan's plans to both good and ill and complicates the structure of the Great Game much more than expected...

A man is torn from his family, forced to serve as the slave of a dark master to guarantee the safe future of his family, forced to collect humanity's souls under the guise of a "pawnshop owner" to further the designs of the devil by making business-like bargains and exchanges with him, for almost anything, from material items ranging from watches to rings to emotion, memory, and even one's eternal soul. The man was granted supernatural abilities by his dark master, including immortal life to more adequately serve the devil, and allowed the company of a pawnshop assistant, all in exchange for an eternity's service to Satan. As a last gift to his wife, the man exchanged his own love, his very ability to love, for his wife to have a lifetime of happiness without him.

Allowed by his master (the devil) to claim one mortal as a companion in the Pawnshop No. 8, as his pawnshop "assistant", aiding him in his bargains and deals with customers, for the rest of eternity, the pawnshop owner initially chose a beautiful and fair woman, offering her freedom from her restricted life as a servant, but another woman, jealous, spiteful and vengeful from a twisted past of sorrow, poverty, and anguish, who Hanuo once sheltered and fed, kills her, and the pawnshop owner instead chooses her: Ajing.

Plot
Legend has it that if you can locate the Pawnshop No. 8, it will honor any request you may have, as long as you are willing to pay the price. It accepts valuable jewelry or house deed. It also gladly accepts your limbs, your love, your sanity, your child's future, and the most valuable commodity to the pawnshop, your soul.

You want to pawn your ability to love in exchange for saving your dying wife? Done.
You want to pawn your fashion design talent for your mother's love? Done.
You want to pawn your soul so that coldhearted woman would die a horrendous death in her every reincarnation? Done.
By the way, the Pawnshop No. 8 loves returning customers. This time, you pawn your friendship to be the top man in your business. Next time, you may just pawn your soul to stay on top.

The story begins with an ancient legend: those who locate the Pawnshop No. 8 will receive anything they desire, as long as they are willing to pay the price. In reality, the Pawnshop No. 8 is a scheme set forth by Dark Shadow, the master of darkness. He uses humanity's endless greed and desire to lure them into transactions, with the ultimate goal of collecting their soul, thereby ruling the world. The shop owner is hand-selected by Dark Shadow. This chosen individual is granted eternal life, the power to predict the future, and all the wealth he will ever need. But what he cannot do is take pawned items for personal use or otherwise betray his master.

During the Ming Dynasty, the pawnshop owner decides to secretly use a client's brain to save his mentally disabled lover. However, Dark Shadow soon finds out, takes back the pawned item, and destroys his disloyal servant by fire. Without an owner to manage the shop, the name of Pawnshop No. 8 temporarily disappears from the world. Dark Shadow then begins his quest for a new owner to continue his dream of world conquest.

Years later, as the Qing Dynasty draws to an end, a salesman's son named Han Nuo happily marries the love of his life, with whom he soon has a son named Han Lei. Unknowingly, he is chosen to become the next owner of the pawnshop. Dark Shadow takes possession of Han Lei's body and begins to threaten Han Nuo by harming his family members one by one. And he will continue to do so if Han Nuo does not agree to devote his eternal life to the pawnshop. Although Han Nuo is hesitant at first, he is finally persuaded when his beloved wife steps into a blazing fire, badly burning her entire body. To save his family, he agrees to manage the pawnshop and also pawns his ability to love for all of eternity in exchange for his wife's one lifetime of happiness.

Thus begins Han Nuo's life as the devil's minion, along with his assistant Chen Jing (known as A-Jing). As a servant of darkness, he is obliged to direct lost souls to Pawnshop No. 8, enticing them again and again, bringing them closer and closer to darkness until they one day willingly part with their soul. As a human being, he is disgusted with some individuals' willingness to exchange priceless items like romantic love, family love, and friendship for success and monetary benefits. He is even more revolted at his responsibility to lure the purest of souls (for they are the most valuable) to Pawnshop No. 8. In appearance, Han Nuo is cold and heartless, but in reality, he is a compassionate human being tormented by loneliness and inexplicable desires. Will he be able to set himself free? How much is he willing to sacrifice?

Did God not hear your plea? What else do you want? To satisfy your desires, what price are you willing to pay? The Pawnshop No. 8 will accept anything, including your soul...

Cast

External links
Official Website
ImaginAsian page

2003 Taiwanese television series debuts
Television shows about reincarnation
2003 Taiwanese television series endings
Television shows written by Ding-yu Xie
2000s supernatural television series